Xian Ji ( 847–913, courtesy name Hongji), known as Cheng Ji before 908, was a general during the late Tang dynasty and early Wuyue kingdom, serving as a chief strategist for Qian Liu, Wuyue's first king. Cheng Ji was very close to Qian Liu, and his son Cheng Rensu married Qian Liu's daughter.

Cheng Ji was captured by warlord Yang Xingmi in 896 but refused to submit. He was eventually returned to Qian Liu.

References

 

840s births
913 deaths